Jonathan Martin Biggins  (born 14 September 1960) is an Australian actor, singer, writer, director and comedian. He has appeared on film, stage and television as well as in satirical sketch comedy television programmes.

He was born in Newcastle, New South Wales, and attended Newcastle Boys' High School in the mid-1970s. He said that it was "a fairly intimidating place to be if you weren't great at sports or maths. However once [I] joined the debating team, and went on to win the state finals, things started looking up."

Biography
Stage appearances include The Importance of Being Earnest (as John Worthing, replacing Geoffrey Rush), A Funny Thing Happened on the Way to the Forum, Orpheus in the Underworld and the Gilbert and Sullivan operas Ruddigore and The Mikado.

His television appearances include The Dingo Principle and Three Men and a Baby Grand, satirical sketch television comedy programmes for which he was a writer/performer with Phillip Scott and Drew Forsythe. He also presented the art panel programme Critical Mass.

His film appearances include Thank God He Met Lizzie and Gettin' Square. He also co-wrote, with Phillip Scott, some of the dialogue for The Man from Snowy River: Arena Spectacular, a stage musical based on the poem "The Man from Snowy River". Biggins also played Peter Sellers in Ying Tong, a play about Spike Milligan and The Goons and an Australian-wide hit.

Biggins has directed the Wharf Revue since 2000, written for the Sydney Morning Herald weekly magazine Good Weekend for seven years and directed the Australian production of Avenue Q. He hosted the New Year's Eve Gala Concert in 2010 at the Sydney Opera House.

He is married to Australian actress Elaine Smith, best known as Daphne Clarke in the soap opera Neighbours. He and Smith have twin daughters born in February 2000.

Awards
Biggins was awarded the Medal of the Order of Australia in the 2021 Queen's Birthday Honours for "service to the performing arts through theatre".

Mo Awards
The Australian Entertainment Mo Awards (commonly known informally as the Mo Awards), were annual Australian entertainment industry awards. They recognise achievements in live entertainment in Australia from 1975 to 2016.
 (wins only)
|-
| 2000
| Jonathan Biggins
| Male Comedy Performer of the Year
| 
|-

References

External links
 
 Meet Jonathan Biggins
 Jonathan Biggins – New South Wales Art Gallery
 The Wharf Revue
 Jonathan Biggins – Interview
 Jonathan Biggins – Supporting Newcastle and Hunter Talent
 Jonathan Biggins – The Wharf Revue – Queensland Musical Festival
 Jonathan Biggins – on ABC TV's Q&A – 26 February 2009

1960 births
Australian male comedians
Australian male film actors
Australian male musical theatre actors
Australian male singers
Australian male stage actors
Australian male television actors
Australian operatic baritones
Australian theatre directors
Helpmann Award winners
Living people
People educated at Newcastle Boys' High School
People from Newcastle, New South Wales
Recipients of the Medal of the Order of Australia
University of Newcastle (Australia) alumni